Jan Inge Sørbø (born 16 September 1954) is a Norwegian philologist, author and poet.

He was born at Bru in Rennesøy municipality in Rogaland, and took the cand.philol. degree in the history of literature at the University of Bergen in 1982. He debuted as a poet in 1986, and has also written novels. He has a background in the media, as journalist in Dagen from 1980 to 1987 and Stavanger Aftenblad from 1987 to 1989, and editor of Syn og Segn from 1993 to 1997. He was appointed professor at the Volda University College in 2001, and has been affiliated with the Ivar Aasen Centre.

References

1954 births
Living people
Norwegian philologists
20th-century Norwegian novelists
21st-century Norwegian novelists
Norwegian essayists
20th-century Norwegian poets
Norwegian male poets
Norwegian biographers
Male biographers
Norwegian journalists
Norwegian editors
University of Bergen alumni
Academic staff of Volda University College
People from Rennesøy
Norwegian male novelists
Male essayists
20th-century essayists
21st-century essayists
20th-century Norwegian male writers
21st-century Norwegian male writers